Spectrolite is an uncommon variety of labradorite feldspar.

Colors 
Spectrolite exhibits a richer range of colors than other labradorites as for instance in Canada or Madagascar (which show mostly tones of blue-grey-green) and high labradorescence.  Due to the unique colors mined in Finland, spectrolite has become  a brand name for material mined only there. Sometimes spectrolite is incorrectly used to describe labradorite whenever a richer display of colors is present, regardless of locality: for example, labradorite with the spectrolite play of colors has sometimes described material from Madagascar.

History 
Finnish geologist Aarne Laitakari (1890–1975) described the peculiar stone and sought its origin for years when his son Pekka discovered a deposit at Ylämaa in south-eastern Finland, while building the Salpa Line fortifications there in 1940.  

The quarrying of spectrolite began after the Second World War and became a significant local industry. In 1973, the first workshop in Ylämaa began cutting and polishing spectrolite for jewels. After that, a gem center was established in Ylämaa with training for gem-cutting accompanied by an annual Gem and Mineral Show initiated by Esko Hämäläinen, mayor of Ylämaa municipality.

References
Seppo Lahti I.1989
The origin of interference colours in spectrolite (iridescent labradorite).Geologi 41.

Feldspar
Gemstones